This is a list of Boston Patriots/New England Patriots players who appeared on the active roster during the regular season or postseason. The history of New England Patriots began in 1960, with the formation of the American Football League.

Players by position

Offense

Quarterback

Running back
Includes player listed as "running back", "halfback", and "fullback".

Wide receiver

Tight end
Includes players listed as "end" and "tight end"

Tackle

Guard

Center
Includes players listed as "center" or "long snapper".  List incomplete, no player cited as playing post 2011

Defense

Defensive back

''Includes players listed as "defensive back", "cornerback", or "safety"

Linebacker

Defensive end

Defensive tackle

Special teams

Kicker

Punter

Notes

References
 - For rosters and player stats.
 - For rosters and player stats; also has Pro Bowl rosters and all-time statistical leaders.
 - For members of the New England Patriots Hall of Fame.
 - For members of the Patriots 10th Anniversary Team (named 1971) and 35th Anniversary Team (named 1994).
 - Many details of individual players from the AFL years, specifically establishes Ron Burton as the team's first draft pick.
 - Features two Patriots: John Hannah and Mike Haynes.

External links
 Official website

 
 
New England Patriots
 
players